Crinow is a village and parish in Pembrokeshire, Wales,  east of Narberth.  The parish is part of the community of Narberth.

Name
The derivation of the placenames (English and Welsh) is obscure.

History
The parish was originally a manor attached to St David's and it formed a detached part of the Hundred of Dungleddy. It appeared on a 1578 map as "Creno". It is close to the Pembrokeshire language frontier and was described as Welsh-speaking by George Owen in 1602, but today it is predominantly English speaking.

In 1934, a detached part of the parish of Lampeter Velfrey was added to Crinow.  The pre-1934 parish had an area of 144 Ha.  Its census populations were: 53 (1801): 69 (1851): 56 (1901): 32 (1951): 31 (1981). The percentage of Welsh speakers was 70 (1891): 48 (1931): 20 (1971).

References

External links 
Historical information and further sources on GENUKI

Villages in Pembrokeshire
Narberth, Pembrokeshire